Sarah Ann Mitchell (née Johnston; born 10 May 1982), an Australian politician, is the Minister for Education and Early Childhood Learning in the second Berejiklian ministry since April 2019, and in the Perrottet ministry. She has been a Nationals member of the New South Wales Legislative Council since March 2011.

Mitchell previously served as the Minister for Early Childhood Education, the Minister for Aboriginal Affairs and the Assistant Minister for Education from January 2017 until March 2019 in the first Berejiklian ministry.

Background and early career
Mitchell was born in Gunnedah, and moved to Grafton as a child. She moved back to Gunnedah while in high school, completing her Higher School Certificate at Gunnedah High School in 1999. She moved to Sydney in 2001, and studied politics and international relations at the University of New South Wales, obtaining a Bachelor of Arts in 2016. Mitchell later moved back to Gunnedah, where she worked as an electorate officer for former Deputy Prime Minister John Anderson. She continued working for Mark Coulton, Anderson's successor as local MP, upon Anderson's 2007 retirement.

Political career
She was later elected president of the federal Young Nationals and chairman of the state Young Nationals, positions which she held until her election to parliament. She was preselected for the eleventh position on the Coalition Legislative Council ticket for the 2011 state election in April 2010; while normally unwinnable, the near-record size of the Coalition's victory saw her emerge victorious for the last seat in an extremely close race with right-wing independent Pauline Hanson. She married Anthony Mitchell in April 2011, and took her husband's name; she had been elected two weeks before under her maiden name of Johnston.

She has served on several standing and select committees, and currently sits on the General Purpose Standing Committee No. 3. During her first years in Parliament, Sarah chaired the General Purpose Standing Committee No. 4, which undertook an inquiry into medicinal cannabis, resulting in a report unanimously in favour of the provision of medicinal cannabis for the terminally ill.

Mitchell was appointed Parliamentary Secretary for Regional and Rural Health and Western NSW on 24 April 2015. Following the resignation of Mike Baird as Premier, Gladys Berejiklian was elected as Liberal leader and sworn in as Premier. The first Berejiklian ministry was subsequently formed with Mitchell sworn in as the Minister for Early Childhood Education, the Minister for Aboriginal Affairs, and the Assistant Minister for Education with effect from 30 January 2017. Following the 2019 state election Mitchell was appointed as the Minister for Education and Early Childhood Learning in the second Berejiklian ministry, with effect from 2 April 2019. She also became the Deputy Leader of the Government in the Legislative Council.

See also

First Berejiklian ministry
Second Berejiklian ministry
 Perrottet ministry

References

 

 

1982 births
National Party of Australia members of the Parliament of New South Wales
Living people
Members of the New South Wales Legislative Council
21st-century Australian politicians
Women members of the New South Wales Legislative Council
21st-century Australian women politicians